Centennial Neighborhood District is a national historic district located at Lafayette, Tippecanoe County, Indiana, United States.  The area originated as the Bartholomew and Davis Additions to Lafayette in 1829.  Growth came rapidly after the Wabash and Erie Canal arrived in 1843, and continued with the arrival of the railroad in 1853.  The Centennial Neighborhood Historic District takes its name from the Centennial School, which was constructed in 1876 on the centennial of the nation.  The school was located on the northeast corner of Brown Street at North 6th Street.  It has since been removed and a park was created at its original location.

History
The area began to grow in the 1830s as the boundaries of Lafayette expanded north and east of the Wabash River.  It was the introduction of the Wabash Canal in 1843 that led to rapid growth. The canal followed the route of Canal Road and the current tracks on the west side of the neighborhood.  The area began to develop mills, warehouses and wharves serving the canal.  The Reverend Samuel Johnson built a house in 1844 on the north east corner of Ferry and Sixth Streets, which is the oldest structure in the district.  The following year, 1844, Richard DeHart House was constructed at 602 N. Fifth Street (northeast corner of Cincinnati and Fifth Streets).  The canal growth came to a close with the arrival of the railroads in 1853.  Five existing houses represent the canal era, located at 716 and 729 Brown Street, 636 Ferry Street and 713-715 North Fourth Street.

The Lafayette and Indianapolis Railroad (L&I) was the first railroad to arrive in Lafayette in 1852.  It ended on Main Street near the current Amtrak Depot, in the Downtown Historic District several blocks south of the neighborhood.  The New Albany and Salem Railroad, later called the Monon Railroad, arrived in 1853; this followed Fifth Street and  began the growth of the area.  The following year, 1854, the Wabash Railroad cut an angle along the Erie Street route, just east of the district.  The railroads needed housing for their crews.  The row house at 417-427 North Fourth Street (1870) is representative of the housing built during this boom.

More affluent residences were built along Ferry Street.  Outstanding examples include the Handley House (874) at 632-634 Ferry Street and the Oppenheimer House at 604 North Sixth Street.

It was in this district that religious and educational structures predominated.  St. John's Episcopal Church was built from 1851 to 1858, and is the district's oldest surviving church.  St. James Lutheran Church, Trinity Methodist Episcopal Church and St. Boniface Catholic Church were built during the 1860s and 1870s in the Gothic Revival style.  Bethel African Methodist Episcopal Church began as Lafayette's first black school.  The Albert A. Wells Memorial Public Library was built in 1928 and is an outstanding example of the Neoclassical style.

The district was listed on the National Register of Historic Places in 1983.

Significant structures
1844, Reverend Samuel Johnson House, 608 Ferry St.
1849, Bethel African Methodist Episcopal Church, 820 Ferry St.
1858, St. James Evangelical Lutheran Church, 800 Cincinnati Street 
1858, St. Johns Episcopal Church, 600 Ferry Street 
1865, St. Boniface Catholic Church, 318 N 9th Street 
1869, Trinity United Methodist Church, 404 N 6th Street 
1872, First Baptist Church, 411 N 7th Street St.
1876, Centennial School (demolished), 2007 Centennial Park, Centennial Park]], 501 N 6th Street 
1893, Pottlitzer House, 801 Brown St.
1893, Wallace Bros. Building, 320 - 328 Ferry St.
1901, Monon Depot (Civic Theatre of Greater Lafayette), 328 N 5th Street 
1908, St. Boniface Catholic School, 815 North Street 
1913, First Christian Church, 329 N 6th Street 
1914, Haywood Printing Company, 300 North 5th St.
1916, Sons of Abraham Synagogue, 661 North 7th St.
1928, Albert A. Wells Memorial Library, 638 North Street

See also 
 Downtown Lafayette Historic District
 Ellsworth Historic District
 Highland Park Neighborhood Historic District
 Jefferson Historic District
Park Mary Historic District
 Perrin Historic District
 St. Mary Historic District
 Upper Main Street Historic District

References

Sources
 Interim Report Tippecanoe County Interim Report, Indiana Historic Sites and Structures Inventory; Historic Landmarks Foundation of Indiana; 1990

Historic districts on the National Register of Historic Places in Indiana
Italianate architecture in Indiana
Second Empire architecture in Indiana
Neighborhoods in Lafayette, Indiana
Historic districts in Lafayette, Indiana
National Register of Historic Places in Tippecanoe County, Indiana